Gogh may refer to:

Gogh, the Dutch name for Goch, a town near Kleve in North Rhine-Westphalia, Germany
Vincent van Gogh, a Dutch painter
Van Gogh (disambiguation)